

Sergio María Ginés Jesús Hernández y Martínez (born 1 July 1959), known by his religious name as Sergio María and by his papal name as Gregory XVIII, is the former Pope of the Palmarian Christian Church. Hernández was in office from 2011 until his 2016 abdication.

Hernández is a former member of the Spanish Military. Hernández is a Carlist.

Between 2005 and 2011, Hernández served as church secretary of state under pope Manuel Corral (Peter II).

After Corral's death, Hernández succeeded Corral, on 16 July 2011, as pope at El Palmar de Troya and adopted the papal name Gregory XVIII. Hernández nominated his successor Joseph Odermatt from Switzerland.

According to Professor Magnus Lundberg, of the University of Uppsala, Hernández abdicated from his papacy on 22 April 2016 and was succeeded on 23 April 2016 by Odermatt, who took Peter III as his papal name.

Following his abdication, Hernández married Nieves Trivedi (a former Palmarian nun) and they both reconciled with the Roman Catholic Church.

Controversy

Criticism of the Church and excommunication 

Following his abdication, Hernández told El País that the Palmarian Christian Church "was all a hoax from the beginning" to profit from believers and supporters of the alleged apparitions of Our Lady of Palmar. His successor, Pope Peter III, published an encyclical letter in response, in which he accused Hernández of discrediting his former Church in his interview and of stealing two million euros from the Palmarian Catholic Church, alongside several goods (including a BMW X6): he subsequently declared him an apostate, excommunicated him and declared all of his acts to be null and void. Hernández denies the charges of stealing.

In May 2016 Hernández gave an interview to El Español, in which he stated that he had left the Church not because he had fallen in love, but because he had lost faith in the Palmarian Norms; he also accused his former Church of many abuses, of which his predecessor Peter II was apparently aware of, though not paedophilia scandals, which he firmly denied. He also stated that he lost several friends after leaving the Palmarian Christian Church.

In 2020 Hernández was again interviewed by El Confidencial: during the interview he accused the Palmarian Christian Church of possessing large quantities of cash money and even weapons; he also regretted not disbanding the Church while he was in charge, but predicted that it would soon collapse on its own.

Attempted robbery in the Cathedral 

On 10 June 2018, Hernández and his wife, Nieves Triviño, climbed over the high walls of the Cathedral-Basilica of Our Crowned Mother of Palmar. They were masked and armed, apparently planning to rob the cathedral, but were discovered by a Palmarian bishop who was outside the Basilica. According to testimonies, they beat the bishop with a hammer and threatened him and another bishop, with a knife. However, in the subsequent fight, Hernández was severely injured, while the others escaped with less serious physical injuries.

Hearing the noise outside the cathedral, other church members came to the assistance and they called the police and an ambulance. Hernández was transported by helicopter to the Virgen del Rocio University Hospital in Seville. After recovering, he and his wife were arrested by the Civil Guard. Both were subsequently charged with the accusations of armed robbery, grave assault and assault.

On 17 May 2019, Hernández and his wife were found guilty of all charges and sentenced to six and five years in prison respectively and to pay a 35.000 euros fine to the two Palmarian Christian bishops they injured. The two, however, were immediately released on probation

See also

 Conclavism
 Antipope

Notes

References

Sources

 

Living people
Antipopes who abdicated
21st-century antipopes
Bishops of Independent Catholic denominations
People excommunicated by the Catholic Church
Spanish religious leaders
Spanish bishops
1959 births
Converts to Roman Catholicism from Catholic Independent denominations
Conclavism